Georgia van der Rohe (born Dorothea Mies; March 2, 1914 – December 10, 2008) was a German dancer, actress, and director.

Life
Georgia van der Rohe, daughter of the renowned architect Ludwig Mies van der Rohe and his wife Ada, grew up in the company of Walter Gropius, Lyonel Feininger, Paul Klee, Oskar Schlemmer and Wassily Kandinsky.

Van der Rohe had two children.

References

1914 births
2008 deaths
German female dancers